SIMes (or H2Imes) is an N-heterocyclic carbene.  It is a white solid that dissolves in organic solvents. The compound is used as a ligand in organometallic chemistry.  It is structurally related to the more common ligand IMes but with a saturated backbone (the S of SIMes indicates a saturated backbone).  It is slightly more flexible and is a component in Grubbs II.  It is prepared by alkylation of trimethylaniline by dibromoethane followed by ring closure and dehydrohalogenation.

References

Carbenes